Miyuki Akiyama (秋山美幸 Akiyama Miyuki, born August 27, 1984) is a Japanese volleyball player who plays for NEC Red Rockets. She is represented by the talent agency AT Production.

Clubs
Taiseijoshi High School → AoyamaGakuin Univ. → NEC Red Rockets (2007-)

National team
The 5th AVC Eastern Zonal Volleyball championships (2006)
 Universiade national team (2007)

References

External links
Red Rockets Officialsite

Japanese women's volleyball players
NEC Red Rockets players
Living people
1984 births
Sportspeople from Ibaraki Prefecture
Aoyama Gakuin University alumni